"We Fit Together" is a song by American boy band O-Town. It produced by Cutfather & Joe and written by Mich Hansen, Joe Belmaati, and Remee. The was released on the soundtrack to the film Dr. Dolittle 2 in June 2001 and appears in the film. In September 2001, it was released as the third single off their self-titled debut album (2001). The song failed to chart on the US Billboard Hot 100 but managed to peak at number 25 on the Mainstream Top 40 chart. It fared better in Europe, reaching the top 40 in Germany, Ireland, and the United Kingdom.

Background
"We Fit Together" was written by Joe Belmaati, Mich Hansen, and Remee, while production on the track was helmed by Bemlaati and Hansen under their production moniker Cutfather & Joe. Recorded in "a tiny studio in Hong Kong" while promoting their self-titled debut album, the song initally appeared on the soundtrack to the fantasy comedy film Dr. Dolittle 2 (2001) and was later included on the band's self-titled debut album after being selected as their third single. On their decision to release the song as a single, band member Jacob Underwood commented in an interview with MTV News: "We just wanted it to be something fun. "All or Nothing" was a very serious big-time ballad- We wanted to go to the opposite [end] of the spectrum – something fun, something for summertime that people could dance to. The lyrics weren't anything serious. It didn't tell a story."

Music video
A music video for the song, directed by Marcus Raboy, depicts the band cavorting on a paradisiacal beach and on an ocean liner. The crew suffered from heavy seasickness during filming.

Track listing

Personnel and credits 
Credits adapted from the liner notes of O-Town.

Joe Belmaati – guitar, producer, programming, writer
Mich Hansen – percussion, producer, writer
Mads Nilsson – recording engineer
Remee – writer

Charts

Release history

References

2001 singles
2001 songs
J Records singles
O-Town songs
Music videos directed by Marcus Raboy
Song recordings produced by Cutfather & Joe
Songs written by Cutfather
Songs written by Remee
Songs written for films